Al. Blachère was a French croquet player. He competed at the 1900 Summer Olympics and came fourth in both his events, the one ball singles and the two ball singles.

References

External links

Date of birth missing
Date of death missing
Olympic croquet players of France
French croquet players
Croquet players at the 1900 Summer Olympics
Place of birth missing
Place of death missing
Missing middle or first names